Paolo Zane (died 1531) was a Roman Catholic prelate who served as Bishop of Brescia (1480–1531).

Biography
On 19 December 1480, Paolo Zane was appointed during the papacy of Pope Sixtus IV as Bishop of Brescia.
He served as Bishop of Brescia until his death in March 1531. While bishop, he was the principal co-consecrator of Gianfrancesco Ugoni, Bishop of Famagusta (1530).

References

External links and additional sources
  (for Chronology of Bishops) 
  (for Chronology of Bishops) 

15th-century Italian Roman Catholic bishops
16th-century Roman Catholic bishops in the Republic of Venice
Bishops appointed by Pope Sixtus IV
1531 deaths